This is a list of diplomatic missions of Slovakia, excluding honorary consulates. The Slovak Ministry of Foreign Affairs oversees the maintenance of these missions.

Current missions

Africa

Americas

Asia

Europe

Oceania

Multilateral Organizations

Gallery

Closed missions

Africa

Americas

Asia

Europe

See also
 Foreign relations of Slovakia
 List of diplomatic missions in Slovakia
 Ministry of Foreign Affairs (Slovakia)

Notes

References

 Ministry of Foreign Affairs of Slovakia

 
Slovakia
Diplomatic missions